USS Patroclus (ARL-19) was laid down as a United States Navy  but converted to one of 39 s that were used for repairing landing craft during World War II. Named for Patroclus (a Homeric character; a beloved of Achilles, slain by Hector while fighting in Achilles' armor), she was the only US Naval vessel to bear the name.

Construction
LST–955 was laid down on 22 September 1944, at Hingham, Massachusetts, by the Bethlehem-Hingham Shipyard; launched 22 October 1944; and placed in reduced commission 13 November 1944, to proceed to Baltimore, Maryland; decommissioned on 27 November; converted to an ARL at the Bethlehem Key Highway Shipyard; and commissioned in full 17 April 1945.

Service history
Following shakedown in Chesapeake Bay, Patroclus departed the east coast 22 May 1945, transited the Panama Canal, and steamed to San Francisco for final outfitting. Steaming westward 2 July, the landing craft repair ship arrived at Saipan 7 August, and reported for duty with Serv Div 103. On 27 August, she continued on to Tokyo Bay, to provide repair facilities for occupation force vessels. Assigned to Tokyo Bay, she witnessed the formal surrender of Japan on 2 September, then commenced repair work on all LSMs, LCIs, LCSs, and LSTs in the area.
 
Decommissioned 2 October 1946, Patroclus was berthed at Green Cove Springs, Florida, as a unit of the Atlantic Reserve Fleet until November 1951. Then, transferred to the custody of the 6th Naval District, she underwent conversion prior to transfer under the Military Assistance Program. Struck from the Naval Vessel Register 22 August 1952, she was transferred to Turkey, on 15 November 1952, where she served that nation as TCG Basaran (A 582). She was scrapped in September 1993.

Notes

Citations

Bibliography 

Online resources

External links
 

 

Achelous-class repair ships
Achelous-class repair ships converted from LST-542-class ships
World War II auxiliary ships of the United States
Ships built in Hingham, Massachusetts
1944 ships
Ships transferred from the United States Navy to the Turkish Navy
Atlantic Reserve Fleet, Green Cove Springs Group